The Great Awakening is a 1941 American historical musical drama film directed by Reinhold Schünzel and starring Alan Curtis, Ilona Massey, and Billy Gilbert. The film was produced by Gloria Pictures Corporation, and released by United Artists. Miklós Rózsa was responsible for the musical direction, though he later expunged the title from his filmography, because he considered it a travesty of the great composer's life story.

The film, sometimes known by the alternative titles New Wine (original title), One Romantic Night (USA reissue title) or Schubert, the Melody Master, was the last directed by Schünzel who was an exile from Nazi Germany.

Plot
Austrian composer Franz Schubert flees from Vienna to avoid conscription, ending up in Hungary where he falls in love.

Cast

References

Bibliography

External links

1941 films
American musical drama films
American biographical films
American historical musical films
1940s musical drama films
1940s historical musical films
Biographical films about musicians
American black-and-white films
Films directed by Reinhold Schünzel
Films set in Vienna
Films set in the 1810s
Films about classical music and musicians
Films about composers
Cultural depictions of Franz Schubert
Depictions of Ludwig van Beethoven on film
United Artists films
1941 drama films
1940s English-language films
1940s American films